Nkayi District may refer to:

 Nkayi District, Congo
 Nkayi District, Zimbabwe